The Northern Lights Masonic Lodge in Cooperstown, North Dakota is a building from 1916. It was listed on the National Register of Historic Places in 1987.

It was deemed "significant in the context of local architecture prior to 1937. It possesses an outstanding collection of stylistic elements which typify the Craftsman style. In addition, the level of its interior and exterior integrity matches the quality of its stylistic expression."

References

Clubhouses on the National Register of Historic Places in North Dakota
Masonic buildings completed in 1916
Masonic buildings in North Dakota
National Register of Historic Places in Griggs County, North Dakota
American Craftsman architecture in North Dakota
1916 establishments in North Dakota